Head over Heels may refer to:

Film and television 
 Head over Heels (1922 film), a film starring Mabel Normand
 Head over Heels (1937 film), a British musical starring Jessie Matthews
 Head over Heels (1979 film) or Chilly Scenes of Winter, an American drama
 Head over Heels (2001 film), an American romantic comedy
 Head over Heels, a 2007 film nominated for Best Short Animation at the 61st British Academy Film Awards
 Head over Heels (2012 film), an American animated short by Timothy Reckart
 Head over Heels (British TV series), a 1993 comedy-drama series
 Head over Heels (American TV series), a 1997 sitcom
 Až po uši, Czech TV series with English title Head over Heels.

Music

Albums
 Head over Heels (Chromeo album), 2018
 Head over Heels (Cocteau Twins album), 1983
 Head over Heels (Paula Abdul album), 1995
 Head over Heels (Poco album), 1975

Songs
 "Head over Heels" (ABBA song), 1982
 "Head over Heels" (Allure song), 1997
 "Head over Heels" (Blue Rodeo song), 1995
 "Head over Heels" (Go-Go's song), 1984
 "Head over Heels" (Tears for Fears song), 1985
 "Head over Heels (In This Life)", by Switchfoot, 2007
 "Head over Heels", by Accept from Balls to the Wall, 1983
 "Head over Heels", by Big Bang from Poetic Terrorism, 2005
 "Head over Heels", by Girlschool from Take a Bite, 1988
 "Head over Heels", by Illustrated Man, 1984
 "Head over Heels", by Midnight Oil from Midnight Oil, 1978
 "Head over Heels", by Nause, 2013
 "Head over Heels", by Runaway June from Blue Roses, 2019
 "Head over Heels", by Tarisai Vushe, 2010
 "Head over Heels", by the Washboard Union, 2016

Other uses 
 Head over Heels (musical), a 2015 jukebox musical
 Head over Heels (video game), a 1987 arcade adventure

See also 
 Head over Heels in Love (disambiguation)
 Limerence, a state of intense romantic desire for another person